Jia Yu Channel (pinyin: jiāyú píndào) was 24-hour Mandarin and Cantonese subscription channel in Malaysia and Singapore, broadcasting under the slogan "Wholesome family entertainment".

This channel was launched on 17 November 2005 by the then-Information Minister Datuk Seri Abdul Kadir Sheikh Fadzir. The channel ceased broadcasting on 1 April 2014, but Astro channel 304 remained on air to broadcast selected programming before its new channel, Kah Lai Toi began its broadcasting a month later.

70% of the content is from Guangdong Television (GDTV) in China and Hong Kong, while the remaining is a source from Cosmos Discovery Sdn Bhd, a local production company.

Jia Yu International
Jia Yu International was a Chinese TV channel from Guangdong, Taiwan & Malaysia broadcasting in Taiwan also the programmes from Yoshimoto Kogyo and movies. This channel was launched in 2009. Available on MOD Channel 87. The channel was closed to replaced KLT-Golden TV International in February 2016.

Programmes
 The Ideal Couple
 The House of 72 Tenants
 The Family
 Liztening
 The Feeling Show
 Battle of Chefs
 Family Whizz
 Health Through Science
 Faye's Online
 Blue Jewel
 Angel
 Food Travel
 M Magazine
 Lady on the Land
 New Year New Beginning
 Jia Yu Chinese New Year Celebration 2014
 Joyful Years
 Documentary Zone
 Yummy
 Fun Travel
 Bitter Taste of Success
 Friends
 I, My Brother
 The Best of Cantonese Art
 Masquerade
 With Father Around
 The Story of Hakka
 Formula X (Jia Yu's animation series)
 Focus Today
 i-Travel
 Approaching Dongguan
 The Mystery Revelation
 Daughter in Law
 Cantonese Art
 GDTV News
 Today Jiang Men
 Nanhai Brezze
 Zhuhai Economic Special Zone
 Food Hunt
 Travelling Tips
 Antique Collection
 The Story of Hakka
 Guangdong Today
 Booming Entertainment
 Crimson Sword Quest
 Pleasant Pearl River
 Brave Calf
 Watch & Talk
 Pearl River Highlights
 26 World Famous Tales
 The King of Mic - Cantonese Song Competition
 Golden Lifestyle
 The Essence of Love
 History Maker
 Fun Zone
 Godbeast Megazord
 S.O.S. (Spirit of Sound)
 JM Bear
 Fashion
 Free & Easy
 Health Recipe
 Noon News
 Survivor Challenge
 News Online
 Chinese Talk
 Let's Tour
 Travel with Star
 At life's End
 For the Worthy Causes
 MY Entertainment
 Unreachable Zone of Darkness
 Super Challenge
 P.S. I Miss You
 Pop Star 2012 Singing Competition
 My Big Day
 Aces Go Places
 Aces Go Places II
 The Best of Cantonese Art
 The Tricks of Fate
 Trials & Tribulation
 Fun Travel
 Glitter with Wong Chee Keong
 Torn Between Two Lovers
 Pioneer
 Desperate Conscience
 Legacy of Time
 All You Can Eat
 Circle of Dragons
 Perfect Match
 Future Star
 Asian New Force
 Best Trips Around the World
 Overseas Zhongshanese
 Mary Go Round
 Zhongshan Story
 BrandCook
 Minky Momo
 Offside
 Doctor Lam
 The Emperor Han Wu
 Tsukuyomi: Moon Phase
 Nanning with Asean
 Butterfly Song
 Janken Man
 Monster
 Bluster
 Great Desire
 Single Family
 Single Family II
 Start from Hong Kong
 Music Rides
 EEG Fun Fun Fun
 Taste of Hong Kong
 Overseas Zhongshanese in North America
 In Search of Medical Breakthrough
 Ransom Express
 Guilty or Not

Programming block
 Glitter with... - Malaysian Chinese Actor/Actress of the month
 Insight Guangdong - Cantonese Information programmes from GDTV Pearl International

Astro Malaysia Holdings television channels
Television channels and stations disestablished in 2014